Nina is a rural locality (a khutor) in Volokonovsky District, Belgorod Oblast, Russia. The population was 60 as of 2010. There is 1 street.

Geography 
Nina is located 18 km northwest of Volokonovka (the district's administrative centre) by road. Chapelnoye is the nearest rural locality.

References 

Rural localities in Volokonovsky District